Kew Railway Bridge spans the River Thames in London, England, between Kew and Strand-on-the-Green, Chiswick. The bridge was opened in 1869.

History
The bridge, which was given Grade II listed structure protection in 1983, was designed by W. R. Galbraith and built by Brassey & Ogilvie for the London and South Western Railway. The bridge is part of an extension to the latter company's railway line from Acton Junction to Richmond. 

In 1964 the north arch under Kew Railway Bridge was acquired by Strand on the Green Sailing Club, and has been rented from British Rail and its heirs ever since.

Design
It consists of five wrought iron lattice girder spans of 35 metres each. The cast iron piers are decorated in three stages. During the Second World War a pillbox was built to guard it on the south end, along with an open enclosure to fire an anti-tank gun from. 

The bridge carries two tracks which are electrified with both third rail and London Underground-style fourth rail. It is now owned by Network Rail and used by London Overground for North London line passenger trains running between Richmond and Stratford. The same tracks are also used by London Underground's District line trains running between Richmond and Upminster.

In fiction
In The Dalek Invasion of Earth, a 1964 serial from the BBC's Doctor Who, the TARDIS materialises under the bridge; it is trapped when the bridge collapses.

A District line train can be seen crossing the bridge in the 1965 film Four in the Morning.

See also 
Crossings of the River Thames
List of lattice girder bridges in the United Kingdom
List of bridges in London

References

External links
 

1869 establishments in England
Bridges completed in 1869
Bridges across the River Thames
Grade II listed buildings in the London Borough of Hounslow
Grade II listed buildings in the London Borough of Richmond upon Thames
Grade II listed bridges in London
Kew, London
Lattice truss bridges
London Overground
Railway bridges in London
Transport in the London Borough of Hounslow
Transport in the London Borough of Richmond upon Thames